Thomas Wilson, Tom Wilson or Tommy Wilson may refer to:

Actors
Thomas F. Wilson (born 1959), American actor most famous for his role of Biff Tannen in the Back to the Future trilogy
Tom Wilson (actor) (1880–1965), American actor
Dan Green (voice actor) (born 1970), American actor sometimes credited as "Tom Wilson" in films

Businessmen
Thomas Wilson (shipping magnate) (1792–1869), British shipping magnate
Thomas Wilson, London merchant for whom Wilsons Promontory is named
Thomas Wilson (industrialist) (fl. 1850s to early 20th century), American business magnate
Thomas E. Wilson (1868–1958), Canadian American businessman, founder of Wilson Sporting Goods and the Wilson and Company meatpacking company
Thomas J. Wilson (born 1958), American businessman

Clergy
Thomas Wilson (dean of Worcester) (died 1586), English Anglican priest
Thomas Wilson (lexicographer) (1563–1622), English Anglican priest, compiler of an early biblical reference work
Thomas Wilson (archdeacon of Cashel) (fl. 1608–1616), Irish Anglican priest
Thomas Wilson (dean of Lismore) (fl. 1611–1622), Irish Anglican priest, also Dean of Dromore
Thomas Wilson (dean of Carlisle) (died 1778), English Anglican priest
Thomas Wilson (bishop) (1663–1755), English Anglican Bishop of Sodor and Man
Thomas Wilson (schoolmaster) (1747–1813), English cleric known as master of Clitheroe grammar school
Thomas Wilson (archdeacon of Worcester) (1882–1961), English Anglican priest

Musicians
Thomas Wilson (composer) (1927–2001), Scottish composer
Tom Wilson (DJ) (1952–2004), Scottish radio/club DJ
Tom Wilson (musician) (born 1959), Canadian rock musician with the band Junkhouse
Tom Wilson (record producer) (1931–1978), American record producer

Politicians
Sir Thomas Wilson (record keeper) (1560?–1629), English official and Member of Parliament
Thomas Wilson (c.1767–1852), MP for the City of London, 1818–1826
Thomas Wilson (mayor) (1787–1863), mayor of Adelaide, Australia
Thomas Wilson (Minnesota politician) (1827–1910), U.S. Representative from Minnesota
Thomas Wilson (Pennsylvania politician) (1772–1824), U.S. Representative from Pennsylvania
Thomas Wilson (Virginia politician) (1765–1826), U.S. Representative from Virginia
Thomas Wilson (Queensland politician) (1865–1933), miner and member of the Queensland Legislative Assembly
Thomas B. Wilson (1852–1929), New York state senator
Thomas Fleming Wilson (1862–1929), British Member of Parliament for North East Lanarkshire, 1910–1911
Thomas Spencer Wilson (1727–1798), British Army officer and Member of Parliament
Thomas Stokeley Wilson (1813–1894), judge in Iowa
T. Webber Wilson (1893–1948), U.S. Representative from Mississippi
Thomas Woodrow Wilson (1856–1924), 28th President of the United States (used his first name until he was a student at Princeton)
Tom Wilson (New Jersey lobbyist) (born 1967), chairman of the New Jersey Republican State Committee

Sportsmen

Association football
Tom Wilson (footballer, born 1896) (1896–1948), England and Huddersfield Town footballer
Tom Wilson (footballer, born 1902) (1902–1992), English footballer
Tom Wilson (footballer, born 1930) (1930–2010), English footballer
Tommy Wilson (footballer, born 1877) (1877–1940), English footballer
Tommy Wilson (footballer, born 1930) (1930–1992), Nottingham Forest and Walsall footballer
Tommy Wilson (footballer, born 1961), head coach of Scotland U-19 national team, as of 2006
Tug Wilson (footballer) (Thomas Harold "Tom" Wilson, 1917–1959), Gillingham F.C. player of the 1930s and 1940s

Baseball
Tom Wilson (1910s catcher) (1890–1953), Major League Baseball catcher
Tom Wilson (2000s catcher) (born 1970), Major League Baseball catcher
Tommy Wilson (shortstop), American baseball player

Cricket
Thomas Wilson (cricketer, born 1841) (1841–1929), English cricketer
Thomas Wilson (cricketer, born 1849) (1849–1924), English cricketer
Thomas Wilson (New Zealand cricketer) (1869–1918), New Zealand cricketer
Thomas Wilson (Middlesex cricketer) (fl. 1880s), English cricketer
Thomas Wilson (cricketer, born 1936) (born 1936), English cricketer
Tommy Wilson (umpire) (born 1937), former English cricket umpire

Other sports
Tom Wilson (basketball) (born 1997), Australian basketball player and footballer
Thomas Wilson (equestrian) (born 1962), Puerto Rican Olympic equestrian
Bubba Wilson (Thomas Eugene Wilson, born 1955), American professional basketball player
Tom Wilson (American football) (1944–2016), Texas A&M University head football coach
Tom Wilson (curler), Canadian curler
Tom Wilson (ice hockey) (born 1994), Canadian ice hockey player
Tommy Wilson (American football) (1932–2006), former National Football League running back
Tommy Wilson (gymnast) (born 1953), British Olympic gymnast

Others
Thomas Wilson (academic) (1726–1799), Irish academic and clergyman
Thomas Wilson (economist) (1916–2001), British economist
Thomas Wilson (rhetorician) (1524–1581), English diplomat, judge, and privy councillor
Thomas Wilson (philanthropist) (1764–1843), English Congregationalist benefactor
Thomas Wilson (poet) (1773–1858), Tyneside poet, writer of The Pitman's Pay
Thomas Braidwood Wilson (1792–1843), Scottish explorer, medical practitioner and settler after whom Wilson Inlet in Western Australia is named 
Thomas Bellerby Wilson (1807–1865), American naturalist
A. T. M. Wilson (1906–1978), known as Tommy, British psychiatrist
Thomas Wilson (shipwreck), American whaleback freighter wrecked in Lake Superior in 1902
Tom Wilson, one of the people behind the Martian Monkey hoax
Tom Wilson (cartoonist) (1931–2011), US cartoonist whose most famous creation was the cartoon Ziggy
Thomas D. Wilson (born 1935), information scientist researching information-seeking behaviors
Thomas Edmonds Wilson (1859–1933), Canadian outfitter and guide
Thomas R. Wilson (born 1946), director of the Defense Intelligence Agency
Tom Wilson (filmmaker) (born 1980), British filmmaker based in Romania
Thomas Wilson, fictional US President in the 2012 film

See also
Thomas Willson (1860–1915), Canadian inventor and industrialist

Wilson, Thomas